Strangeitude is the third studio album by British band Ozric Tentacles. It was released in 1991 on Dovetail Records and re-released in 1998 by Snapper Music.

Track listing
 "White Rhino Tea" (Ozric Tentacles) - 5:55
 "Sploosh!" (Ed Wynne) - 6:26
 "Saucers" (Ed Wynne) - 7:32
 "Strangeitude" (Ozric Tentacles) - 7:32
 "Bizarre Bazaar" (Ozric Tentacles) - 4:07
 "Space Between Your Ears" (Ozric Tentacles) - 7:48
 "Live Throbbe" (Ed Wynne) - 7:16
 "Weirditude" (Ozric Tentacles) - 5:13 (Re-release bonus track)

Credits
Ed Wynne: Guitars, Synths, Production
Roly Wynne: Bass
John Egan: Flute, Voice (Credited as Eoin Eogan on early releases)
Joie Hinton: Synths, Bubbles
Mervin Pepler: Drums
Paul Hankin: Congas on "Sploosh!" and "Live Throbbe"
John Canham: Engineering

Notes
The album's seventh track, "Live Throbbe", is a live version of "The Throbbe" from Erpland.

Charts
Album

References

1991 albums
Ozric Tentacles albums